The Cape Verde storm petrel (Hydrobates jabejabe) is an oceangoing bird found in the Atlantic Ocean, especially around the islands of Cape Verde. It was at one time considered to be a subspecies of the band-rumped storm petrel, but is now considered to be a separate species by the International Ornithological Congress and other authorities.

They breed much of year but most nest in the winter.

Description
This bird is darker in plumage and the white rump is less conspicuous than Leach's storm petrel.

References

External links

Cape Verde storm petrel
Endemic birds of Cape Verde
Cape Verde storm petrel